Brian Bates (born August 16, 1972 in Woodbridge, Virginia) is a retired American soccer defender who spent four seasons in Major League Soccer and three in the USISL.

Club career
Bates attended the University of Virginia, playing on the men’s soccer team from 1990 to 1993.  Bates and his team mates won the 1991, 1992 and 1993 NCAA Men's Soccer Championship.  In 1994, he signed with the Richmond Kickers of the USISL.  In 1995, the Kickers won both the league and Open Cup titles, giving Bates a double.  On February 6, 1996, the Colorado Rapids selected Bates in the fourth round (thirty-second overall) in the 1996 MLS Inaugural Player Draft.  On November 6, 1997, the Chicago Fire selected Bates with the 19th pick in the 1997 MLS Expansion Draft.  He played two games for Chicago before being traded to the Dallas Burn for Tom Soehn.  On January 16, 1999, the Dallas Burn traded Bates to D.C. United for a second round pick in the 1999 MLS College Draft.  Bates played one game for D.C. before being placed on waivers on May 13, 1999.  He moved to the Maryland Mania of the USISL for four games before signing with the Charleston Battery for the remainder of the season.

National team
In 1989, he was a member of the U.S. U-16 national team at the 1989 FIFA U-16 World Championship.  Although the U.S. defeated Brazil its first game, the team finished group play with a 1-1-1 record, and failed to qualify for the second round.  Following the tournament, Bates played several games with the U.S. U-20 national team in 1989 and 1990.

References

External links
 Charleston Battery: Brian Bates

1972 births
Living people
American soccer players
Charleston Battery players
Chicago Fire FC players
Colorado Rapids players
FC Dallas players
MLS Pro-40 players
D.C. United players
Maryland Mania players
NCAA Division I Men's Soccer Tournament Most Outstanding Player winners
Richmond Kickers players
Virginia Cavaliers men's soccer players
People from Woodbridge, Virginia
USISL players
Major League Soccer players
Soccer players from Virginia
United States men's youth international soccer players
United States men's under-20 international soccer players
A-League (1995–2004) players
Association football defenders